Oltra is a surname. Notable people with the surname include:

José Luis Oltra (born 1969), Spanish footballer
Manuel Oltra (1922–2015), Spanish composer
María Oltra (born 1963), Spanish politician
Mònica Oltra (born 1969), Spanish politician
Silvio Oltra (1958–1995), Argentine racing driver